Castanoclobos is a genus of liverworts belonging to the family Pseudolepicoleaceae.

The species of this genus are found in Australia and New Zealand.

Species:
 Castanoclobos julaceus (Hatcher ex J.J.Engel) J.J.Engel & Glenny

References

Jungermanniales
Jungermanniales genera